Ponte Preta Sumaré Futebol Clube, commonly known as Ponte Preta Sumaré, was a Brazilian football club based in Sumaré, São Paulo state.

History
The club was founded on April 19, 2001, as Associação Atlética Ponte Preta reserve team, after a partnership between the club and Sumaré City Hall. They finished in the second position in the 2001 Campeonato Paulista Série B3, when they lost the competition to Corinthians B. The club folded in 2002, after the partnership with Associação Atlética Ponte Preta ended.

Stadium
Ponte Preta Sumaré Futebol Clube played their home games at Estádio Municipal José Pereira. The stadium has a maximum capacity of 5,000 people.

See also
 Associação Atlética Ponte Preta
 Sumaré Atlético Clube

References

Association football clubs established in 2001
Association football clubs established in 2002
Associação Atlética Ponte Preta
Defunct football clubs in São Paulo (state)
2001 establishments in Brazil
2002 disestablishments in Brazil